= Juan Antonio Name Name =

Mexican politician and businessman

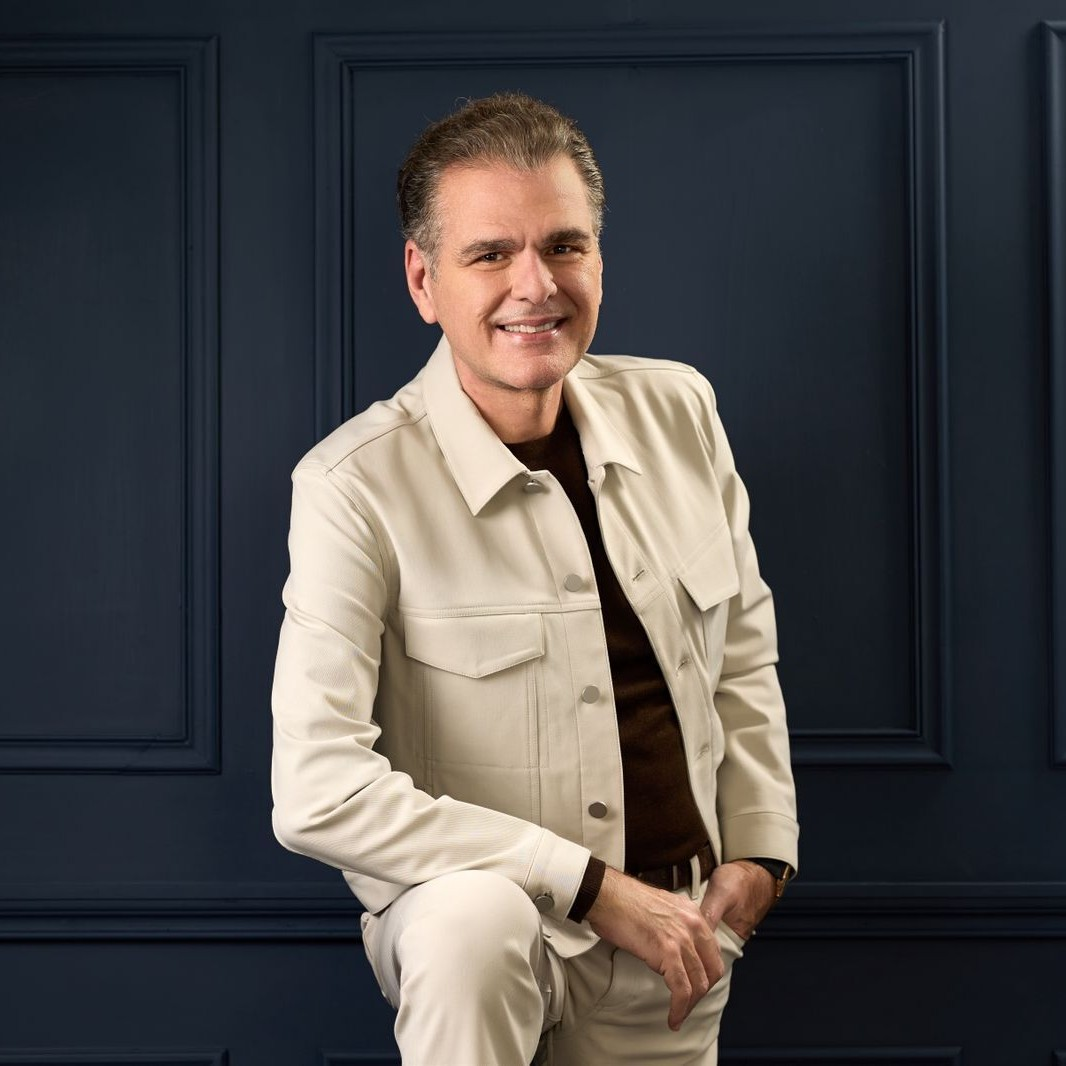
- Born: July 10, 1968 (age 58); Mexico

Juan Antonio Name Name (born July 10, 1968) is a former Mexican federal politician and businessman active in textile distribution and commercial real-estate development. He was a member of the Chamber of Deputies of the General Congress of Mexico (Congreso de la Unión) for the LIX Legislature (LIX Legislatura), serving from September 1, 2003, to August 31, 2006.

== Early life and background ==
Juan Antonio Name Name was born in Mexico and began working at an early age in his family's business, La Perla, located in the state of Coahuila. He holds a bachelor's degree in business administration and a master's degree in public health.

== Political career (2003–2006) ==
In the early 2000s he joined public politics and became elected as a Federal Deputy (Diputado Federal). He was elected to the Chamber of Deputies of the General Congress of Mexico (Congreso de la Unión) for the LIX Legislature (LIX Legislatura), serving from September 1, 2003, to August 31, 2006.

== Other activities ==
Name Name was involved in the textile sector from the 1980s until 2008. In 1991 he founded Telas La Perla in Mexico City, opening his first store in the historic center. By 1995, the business had expanded to five wholesale stores in one of the country's main commercial areas. During his involvement in the textile sector, Name Name participated in textile sourcing and distribution activities. He was also involved in operations related to companies such as Textilera Central Natex S.A. de C.V. and Centrotelas S.A. de C.V., where he took part in commercial and operational activities within the sector.

After leaving the textile sector, Name Name entered the real estate industry and founded PlaSalud S.A. de C.V. Following the global financial crisis in 2008 and increased competition in the textile market, Name Name restructured his business activities, reducing involvement in retail operations and focusing on distribution activities. He has been listed as a principal of Bn LLC, a privately held company based in La Jolla, California. He has also been listed as a manager of Cosmos Water Damage Restoration LLC, a California-registered limited liability company involved in cleaning and restoration services.
